Xuri Subdistrict is a subdistrict in Shangrao County, Jiangxi, China. , it has 21 residential communities under its administration.

See also 
 List of township-level divisions of Jiangxi

References 

Township-level divisions of Jiangxi
Shangrao